Aqtogai is a district of Pavlodar Region in northern Kazakhstan. The administrative center of the district is the selo of Aqtogay. Population:

Physico-geographical characteristic

Geographic location
The area is 9.8 thousand km² (7.69% of the territory of the region). It occupies the 5th place in terms of size among the districts of the region. Aktogay District is located in the south of the West Siberian Plain, on the left bank of the Irtysh.
In the north it borders on Irtysh district, in the south - on the rural areas of the cities of Aksu and Ekibastuz, in the west - on Akmola and North Kazakhstan regions, in the east - with Terenkol region and Pavlodar regions along the Irtysh river.

Climate
Climate Sharply continental climate. The average temperature in January is -17°-19°C, in July - +20°+21°C. Annual amount of atmospheric precipitation - 250-300 mm.

Relief and Hydrography
The relief of the territory is flat (Irtysh plain). Reserves of natural building materials have been explored in the bowels. Minerals: common salt, sands, clays.

Flora and fauna
The vegetation is steppe, forb-feather grass; poplar, maple, willow, meadowsweet grow in the river valleys. Live wolf, fox, hare, korsak, badger, gopher, hamster.

References

Districts of Kazakhstan
Pavlodar Region